Yessin Rahmouni (also spelled Yassine, born 2 October 1984) is a Moroccan Olympic dressage rider. Representing Morocco, he competed at the 2012 Summer Olympics in London where he finished 49th in the individual competition.

He also competed at the 2014 World Equestrian Games in Normandy where he finished 81st. At both occasions he competed with Floresco, the former horse of Patrik Kittel.

He represented Morocco at the 2020 Summer Olympics in Tokyo, finishing 44th in the individual competition.

References

External links

 
 

 
 

Living people
1984 births
Moroccan male equestrians
Moroccan dressage riders
Equestrians at the 2012 Summer Olympics
Equestrians at the 2020 Summer Olympics
Olympic equestrians of Morocco
Dutch sportspeople of Moroccan descent
Dutch male equestrians
Dutch dressage riders
Sportspeople from Haarlem